John Benedict Kelly  (March 13, 1879 – March 19, 1944) was a Major League Baseball player.

Sources

1879 births
1944 deaths
Major League Baseball outfielders
St. Louis Cardinals players
Minor league baseball managers
Troy Washerwomen players
Troy Trojans (minor league) players
Montreal Royals players
Baltimore Orioles (IL) players
Newark Indians players
Jersey City Skeeters players
Scranton Miners players
Syracuse Stars (minor league baseball) players
Baseball players from Pennsylvania
People from Clifton Heights, Pennsylvania
Sportspeople from Delaware County, Pennsylvania